James H. Kelly (October 15, 1919 – July 13, 1984) was an American politician who served as Boston Fire Commissioner and a member of the Massachusetts House of Representatives.

Early life
Kelly was born on October 15, 1919 in Boston. He graduated from Mission High School and Northeastern University and worked as an insurance broker.

Political career
Kelly was a member of the Massachusetts House of Representatives from 1953 to 1967. He was an unsuccessful candidate for state auditor in 1966, losing to incumbent Thaddeus M. Buczko 60% to 40% in the Democratic primary. After leaving the legislature, Kelly served as deputy state treasurer under Robert Q. Crane. In November 1968 he was named Boston Fire Commissioner by Mayor Kevin White. He retired on July 11, 1975 while under investigation for allegedly violating state law by pressuring members of the department into contributing to White's 1971 campaign. He would be the last civilian commissioner of the department until 2006. On August 15, 1975 he and deputy chief Leslie Magoon were indicted on charges of conspiracy and violating three of the state's election laws. According to the indictment, the two and others promised to promote BFD personnel in exchange for contributions to White's mayoral campaign. On July 1, 1976, Kelly and Magoon were acquitted of the conspiracy charge.

Kelly died on July 13, 1984 at his home in Hyannis, Massachusetts.

See also
 1953–1954 Massachusetts legislature
 1955–1956 Massachusetts legislature

References

1919 births
1984 deaths
20th-century American politicians
Commissioners of the Boston Fire Department
Democratic Party members of the Massachusetts House of Representatives
Northeastern University alumni
People from Hyannis, Massachusetts
Politicians from Boston